Carson County may refer to:

Carson County, Texas
Carson County, Utah Territory, now Carson City, Nevada